Carl Gordon (13 March 1931 – 2002) was a Scottish journalist. He was born in Greenock on 13 March 1931, and attended Mearns Street School and Greenock High School. His maternal grandfather was from Copenhagen, and when he left school at the age of 14 he had already started to teach himself Danish. His first job was as a railway clerk and he worked at various stations in the Greenock area before being called up for National Service in 1949. After training in the Royal Army Service Corps (now the Royal Logistic Corps) he was posted to the War Office (now the Ministry of Defence) and left with the rank of sergeant in 1951.

He had announced at the age of 11 that he wanted a career as a journalist and in fact had to turn down the offer of a job as a reporter only a few months before beginning National Service. Within a week of leaving the Army, however, he began work with The Greenock Telegraph and eventually became the evening paper's first deputy news-editor.

He left in 1967 on being offered the post of Greenock-based reporter for the Glasgow Herald and Evening Times. The area to be covered was the entire Lower Clyde including Dunoon and Rothesay and involved long hours of duty.

In the late 1960s an average of 12 ships of various sizes were still being launched each year from Lower Clyde shipyards. In addition there were calls by trans-Atlantic liners and the docks were also busy. The district had three town councils to be attended and the US base at the Holy Loch and the beginnings of the oil industry were also sources of news.

With the eventual down-turn and closure of shipyards and heavy industry, however, it became apparent after a few years that there was no longer a need for a journalistic presence and Carl Gordon transferred to Glasgow in 1979.

Among the stories he covered from Glasgow were the sinking of the Kintyre fishing boat Antares with the loss of its four crewmen after the boat's nets were snagged by a Royal Navy submarine HMS Trenchant, and the subsequent fatal accident inquiry.

He also covered the Arthur Thompson murder trial in 1992, which sat for 54 days over a three-month period at the High Court in Glasgow and was, until the Camp Zeist trial, the longest in Scottish criminal history. It was not generally known that a few days after the trial concluded, he received a note of thanks for his reporting of the trial from Lord McCluskey, the presiding judge. Paul Ferris, who was found not guilty of the murder, had written to The Herald during the trial praising the newspaper's coverage of the proceedings.

Carl Gordon retired in 1994. Afterwards he undertook frequent visits to Scandinavia, particularly Denmark, where he still had relatives and many friends. He wrote about his travels in The Herald, often choosing places little known to Scottish readers. He was a member of the Scandinavia Philatelic Society and the Greenock Philatelic Society. In 1965 he married Arline June Bloomfield who died, aged 37, in 1984. They had a son and a daughter.

1931 births
2002 deaths
People from Greenock
Scottish journalists
Royal Army Service Corps soldiers
20th-century British Army personnel